Merycoidodon ("ruminating teeth") is an extinct genus of herbivorous  artiodactyl of the family Merycoidodontidae, more popularly known by the name Oreodon ("hillock teeth").

Taxonomy
 
Most researchers in paleobiology and paleontology now use the antecedent genus Merycoidodon to refer to this Oligocene epoch oreodont, even though it was once widely known by the younger synonym of Oreodon. Taxonomically speaking, Merycoidodon belongs to the family Merycoidodontidae (once known as "Oreodontidae"), a group of artiodactyls related to camels that were endemic to North America. Its ancestors date back to the Eocene and its last descendants are known from the end of the Miocene, so that oreodonts, broadly speaking, lived throughout most of the Tertiary era.

Morphology
 
 
The fore limbs had five toes (although the first one was vestigial), while the hind limbs had four. Given the shape of the limbs, it is unlikely that the animals would have been able to run fast. Unlike modern ruminants, they had a full set of teeth, although the molars were adapted for grinding up tough vegetation. Notably, they had strong, and very striking, canines.

The skulls of Merycoidodon have a pit in front of the eyes. Similar pits are found in the skulls of modern deer, where they contain a scent gland used for marking territory. Although Merycoidodon was not directly related to deer, it seems likely that it possessed a similar gland, which may imply that it, too, was territorial. Oreodonts lived in large herds and moved about from place to place. They seem to have had a predilection for well-watered regions, where food was plentiful and succulent. The number of fossils found implies that, at one time, oreodonts were as plentiful in South Dakota as zebras are today on the serengeti plains, and as common in Denver, Colorado as cattle on the Colorado farm range.

Fossil distribution
Fossils have been uncovered from as far north as Alberta, Canada to Florida, Texas, Colorado and Oregon in the United States.

Gallery

References

Benes, Josef. Prehistoric Animals and Plants. Pg. 219. Prague: Artua, 1979.

External links
ND Geological Survey

Oreodonts
Eocene even-toed ungulates
Oligocene even-toed ungulates
Chattian genus extinctions
White River Fauna
Fossil taxa described in 1848
Prehistoric even-toed ungulate genera